The Internal Security Unit (ISU) was the counter-intelligence and interrogation unit of the Provisional Irish Republican Army (IRA). This unit was often referred to as the Nutting Squad.

The unit is thought to have had jurisdiction over both Northern and Southern Commands of the IRA, (encompassing the whole of Ireland), and to have been directly attached to IRA General Headquarters (GHQ).

Duties
The group was believed to have had a number of briefs:
 Security and character vetting of new recruits to the IRA,
 Collecting and collating material on failed and compromised IRA operations,
 Collecting and collating material on suspect or compromised individuals (informers),
 Interrogation and debriefing of suspects and compromised individuals,
 Carrying out killings and lesser punishments of those judged guilty by IRA courts martial.

The ISU was believed to have unlimited access to the members, apparatus and resources of the IRA in carrying out its duties. Its remit could not be countermanded except by order of the Army Council.

Depositions obtained as part of its operation would ideally be noted on paper, and if possible recorded for the purposes of propaganda.

Activity

The ISU carried out debriefing of IRA volunteers following their detention by security forces operating in Northern Ireland. These interviews would take place to discover if a volunteer had betrayed information or secrets of the organisation.  They would also take place in the event of an operation, weapons cache, or unit being exposed to danger or uncovered.

The membership of the IRA and wider republican community were expected to comply with requests for information made by the ISU, this information then being used to build or refute accusations made against an IRA volunteer.

See also
 Disappeared (Northern Ireland)
 Stakeknife, a double agent thought to be Freddie Scappaticci
 Joseph Fenton
 John Joe McGee
 Murders of Catherine and Gerard Mahon
 Murder of Thomas Oliver

References

Further information/sources
Ingram, Martin with Greg Harkin. "Stakeknife".  Britain's secret agents in Ireland"'', O'Brien Press, 2004.

External links
 "Victims were sacrificed by agent known as 'Stakeknife'", irishnews.com, 22 October 2015; accessed 3 August 2017. 
 Scappaticci profile, theguardian.com, 12 May 2003.
 "It's time ordinary republicans stopped being led like sheep" - Ingram interview with the Sunday Tribune, cryptome.quintessenz.org, 19 February 2006.
Lengthy Interview given by Martin Ingram on Radio Free Éireann describing his FRU activities" NOTE, the interview begins after twenty-five minutes

Provisional Irish Republican Army